Bapatla revenue division is an administrative division in the Bapatla district of the Indian state of Andhra Pradesh. It is one of the three revenue divisions in the district and comprises 6 mandals. It was formed on 4 April 2022 along with the newly formed Bapatla district.

Administration 
The revenue division comprises 6 mandals which include Bapatla mandal, Pittalavanipalem mandal, Karlapalem mandal, Parchuru Mandal, Martur Mandal, Yeddanapudi Mandal

References 

2022 establishments in Andhra Pradesh
Bapatla district